Chillin' is an album by the American R&B vocal group Force MDs. The hit single "Tender Love" also appears on the soundtrack to Krush Groove.

The album peaked at No. 69 on the Billboard 200.

Production
The album was mostly produced by Tommy Boy house producer Robin Halpin, with the exception of two tracks. "Tender Love" was written by the production duo of Jimmy Jam and Terry Lewis. The album marked a shift in the group's sound, downplaying the rap songs in favor of more ballads.

Critical reception

Trouser Press wrote: "From the ridiculous rap of 'Force M.D.’s Meet the Fat Boys' (partially sung to the melody of 'Gilligan’s Island' and guest-starring the tubby three) to the catchy, falsetto-over-scratch-beats title track, the versatile M.D.’s mix credible urban savvy with enough smooth showbiz to please hard beatboys and mature soul fans alike." The Washington Post thought that "the Force M.D.'s give their intoxicating harmonies the believable edge of impatient desires and streetwise arrangements." 

The Los Angeles Times opined: "More comfortable with dreamy balladry than razor-edged rapping, the M.D.'s may not look as harmless as New Edition, but its love songs are equally sweet." The Seattle Times praised the group's "smooth, polished sound," and called "One Plus One" "a high-powered tune influenced by [the] Jackson Five." 

AllMusic declared that the group "quietly reinvented quiet storm/R&B for the '80s with their doo wop-heavy 'Tender Love'."

Track listing

Personnel
Paul Pesco - guitar, drum programming
Robin Halpin, Vince Madison - keyboards, synthesizer
Bashiri Johnson - percussion
Skip McDonald - guitar on "Here I Go Again"
Doug Wimbish - bass on "Here I Go Again"
Keith LeBlanc - drums on "Here I Go Again"
Eric Calvi - drum programming
John "M.J." Hickman - keyboards on "Force MD's Meet the Fat Boys"
The Fat Boys - vocals on "Force MD's Meet the Fat Boys"

References

1985 albums
albums produced by Jimmy Jam and Terry Lewis
Tommy Boy Records albums